The Hollywood Music in Media Award for Best Original Score in a Documentary is one of the awards given annually to people working in the motion picture and television industry by the Hollywood Music in Media Awards (HMMA).

History
It is presented to the composers who have composed the best "original" score, written specifically for a documentary, either film or television. The award was first given in 2014, during the fifth annual awards.

Winners and nominees

2010s

2020s

References

Best Original Score in a Documentary
Film awards for best score
Awards established in 2014